Baniwa (Baniva) is a name applied to several languages of the Amazon. It may refer to: 

Avane language (Abane)
Baniwa of Içana (Karu) or Carútana-Baniwa language
Baniwa of Maroa 
Baniwa of Guainía
Baniwa of Yavita

See also
Banawa language
Tapuya language (disambiguation)
Maku people